Emmanuel Mané-Katz (Hebrew: מאנה כץ), born Mane Leyzerovich Kats (1894–1962), was a Litvak painter born in Kremenchuk, Ukraine, best known for his depictions of the Jewish shtetl in Eastern Europe.

Biography 
Mane-Katz moved to Paris at the age of 19 to study art, although his father wanted him to be a rabbi. During the First World War he returned to Russia, at first working and exhibiting in Petrograd; following the October revolution, he traveled back to Kremenchuk, where he taught art. In 1921, due to the ongoing fighting in his hometown during the civil war, he moved once again to Paris. There he became friends with Pablo Picasso and other important artists, and was affiliated with the art movement known as the School of Paris; together with other outstanding Jewish artists of that milieu, he is sometimes considered to be part of a group referred to specifically as the Jewish School of Paris.

In 1931, Mane-Katz's painting The Wailing Wall was awarded a gold medal at the Paris World's Fair.

Early on, his style was classical and somber, but his palette changed in later years to bright, primary colors, with an emphasis on Jewish themes. His oils feature Hassidic characters, rabbis, Jewish musicians, beggars, yeshiva students and scenes from the East European shtetl.

Mane-Katz made his first trip to Mandate Palestine in 1928, and thereafter visited the country annually. He said his actual home was Paris, but his spiritual home was Eretz Yisrael, the Land of Israel.

Mane-Katz museum 
Mane-Katz left his paintings and extensive personal collection of Jewish ritual art to the city of Haifa, Israel. Four years before his death, the mayor of Haifa, Abba Hushi, provided him with a building on Mount Carmel to house his work, which became the Mane-Katz Museum. The exhibit includes Mane-Katz's oils, showing a progressive change in style over the years, a signed portrait of the artist by Picasso dated 1932 and a large collection of Jewish ritual objects.

In 1953, Mane-Katz donated eight of his paintings to the Glitzenstein Museum in Safed, whose artists quarter attracted leading Israeli artists in the 1950s and 1960s, and housed some of the country's most important galleries.

See also

 Visual arts in Israel

Further reading  
 Aimot, J. Mane-Katz. 1933
 Ragon, M. Mane-Katz. 1961
 Werner, A. Mane-Katz. 1960

References

External links 

 Mané-Katz Museum
 An artwork by Emmanuel Mane-Katz at the Ben Uri site
 marblearchfinearts.com
 mede-gallery.com
 artnet.de
 "Not Marc Chagall" ewishideasdaily.com

Jewish painters
Israeli painters
20th-century French painters
20th-century French male artists
French male painters
Russian male painters
Biographical museums in Israel
Museums in Haifa
Ukrainian Jews
Israeli people of French-Jewish descent
People from Kremenchuk
1894 births
1962 deaths
School of Paris
Jewish School of Paris
Art museums and galleries in Israel
Emigrants from the Russian Empire to France